Dianthus grossheimii, often called Grossheim's pink or Gvozdika Grossgejma, is native to Turkey and Transcaucasus. It is often found in mountain steppes and meadows.

A perennial herb, D. grossheimii produces flowers with pink or purple petals that are dentate on the outer edges. These flowers are produced either singly or in a compact corymbiform inflorescence, with a calyx that's about 15-17mm long and a short pedicel. The calyx features 8 epicalyx scales. This plant may reach 20-30cm across, and produces linear-lanceolate leaves (typically 3-3.5cm long), a taproot, and pubescent stems.

References

grossheimii
Flora of Turkey